Allan W. Holman, Jr. (July 28, 1929 – September 6, 2010) is a former Republican member of the Pennsylvania House of Representatives.  He was born in Hazleton, Pennsylvania, in 1929.  He married Joan Robinson and raised a family of three children, Andrew, Robin, and Anne.  He later had eight grandchildren, Jenn, Sarah, Rachael, Robbie, Sam, Andy, Elliott, and Julian. After serving as a state Representative, he continued his career as a lawyer, and began the Law Offices of Holman and Holman with daughter Robin.  He also created plans for Little Buffalo State Park; thus the park lake was named "Holman Lake" in his honor.  Though referred to as "Holman's Mudhole" in the beginning, the park became a beautiful spot for hikers, swimmers, boaters, and fishing enthusiasts.
Throughout his life, Holman also donated money to various charities.  He volunteered with the Boy Scouts, and served as a member of many organizations throughout Perry County.  He also spent a lot of time watching sports, Penn State being his favorite team.

References

Republican Party members of the Pennsylvania House of Representatives
2010 deaths
1929 births
People from Hazleton, Pennsylvania